1914 is a 1931 German drama film directed by Richard Oswald and starring Albert Bassermann, Hermann Wlach and Wolfgang von Schwindt. The film focuses on the leadership of the Great Powers of Europe in the days leading up to the outbreak of the First World War, culminating in the assassination of Archduke Franz Ferdinand of Austria by Gavrilo Princip. It was shot at the Babelsberg Studios in Berlin and premiered in the city at the Tauentzien-Palast on 20 January 1931. A special screening was held at the Reichstag on 3 March 1931.

Cast

References

Bibliography

External links

1931 films
Films of the Weimar Republic
1931 drama films
1930s German-language films
Films directed by Richard Oswald
Films set in Berlin
Films set in Saint Petersburg
Films set in Vienna
Films set in London
Films set in 1914
Films shot in Berlin
German docudrama films
German black-and-white films
Cultural depictions of Archduke Franz Ferdinand of Austria
Cultural depictions of Gavrilo Princip
Films about the assassination of Archduke Franz Ferdinand of Austria
Cultural depictions of Franz Joseph I of Austria
Cultural depictions of Nicholas II of Russia
Films set in Sarajevo
Films with screenplays by Fritz Wendhausen
Films shot at Babelsberg Studios
Cultural depictions of Peter I of Serbia
Cultural depictions of Alexander I of Yugoslavia
Films set in Austria-Hungary
1930s German films